Calum Peter O'Connor-Kitscha (born 6 April 1993) is an English professional footballer who plays as a goalkeeper for Ware.

Club career
After starting his career at Bishop's Stortford, Kitscha joined Conference South side Histon in 2011. Kitscha went onto make over fifty appearances for Histon, before leaving to join Hayes & Yeading United for the 2014–15 campaign. On 9 August 2014, Kitscha made his Hayes & Yeading United debut in their 1–0 away victory against St Albans City. Kitscha went onto make twenty more appearances for Hayes & Yeading that season, operating as a back-up to Grant Smith for the remainder of the campaign.

On 9 July 2015, preceding his release from Hayes & Yeading, Kitscha joined National League side Cheltenham Town on a one-year deal. On 12 December 2015, Kitscha made his Cheltenham Town debut in their FA Trophy tie against Chelmsford City, which resulted in a 3–1 victory. On 30 August 2016, after signing a new one-year deal in June 2016, Kitscha made his Football League debut during an EFL Trophy tie against Blackpool, with the fixture resulting in a 2–1 defeat for the Robins. On 9 May 2017, it was announced that Kitscha would leave Cheltenham upon the expiry of his contract in June 2017.

On 10 November 2017, Kitscha joined National League South side Welling United, following his release from Cheltenham in June. In February 2018, he then joined Bishop's Stortford FC. He played 13 games for the club, before he joined Hoddesdon Town. After a brief spell with Hoddesdon Town, Kitsche re-joined Bishop's Stortford FC. On 24 January 2019, he then joined Ware FC.

Career statistics

Honours

Cheltenham Town
Vanarama National League Winners: 2015-16

References

External links
Calum Kitscha at Ware FC's website
Calum Kitscha at Aylesbury United

1993 births
Living people
Footballers from Enfield, London
English footballers
Association football goalkeepers
Bishop's Stortford F.C. players
Histon F.C. players
Walton & Hersham F.C. players
Hayes & Yeading United F.C. players
Cheltenham Town F.C. players
Worcester City F.C. players
Welling United F.C. players
Hoddesdon Town F.C. players
Ware F.C. players
National League (English football) players
English Football League players
England semi-pro international footballers